Fimbristylis cymosa, commonly known as tropical fimbry, or St. John's sedge, is a sedge of the family Cyperaceae that is native to Australia.

It blooms between February and September and produces brown flowers.

In Western Australia it is found near the coast, on dunes and behind mangroves in the Kimberley region where it grows in sandy-clay alluvium around basalt or sandstone rocks.

References

Plants described in 1810
Flora of Western Australia
cymosa
Taxa named by Robert Brown (botanist, born 1773)